The Big Sky Conference (BSC) is a collegiate athletic conference affiliated with the NCAA's Division I with football competing in the Football Championship Subdivision. Member institutions are located in the western United States in the eight states of Arizona, California, Colorado, Idaho, Montana, Oregon, Utah, and Washington. Four affiliate members each participate in one sport: two from California are football–only participants and two from the Northeast participate only in men's golf.

History

Initially conceived for  the Big Sky was founded  on July 1, 1963, with six members in  four of the charter members have been in the league from its founding, and a fifth returned in 2014 after an 18-year absence.

The name "Big Sky" came from the popular 1947 western novel by A. B. Guthrie Jr.; it was proposed by Harry Missildine, a sports columnist of the Spokesman-Review just prior to the founding meetings of the conference in Spokane in February 1963, and was adopted with the announcement of the new conference five days later.

Starting in 1968, the conference competed at the highest level (university division) in all sports except football (college division). The sole exception was Idaho, in the university division for football through 1977 (except 1967, 1968). Football moved to the new Division I-AA in 1978, which was renamed Division I  Football Championship Subdivision (FCS) in 2006.

In 1974, half of the Big Sky's ten sports were dropped (baseball, skiing, swimming, golf, and tennis), leaving football, basketball, wrestling, track, and cross country.

Women's sports were added  in 1988, moving from the women's-only Mountain West Athletic Conference (1982–88).

Fiftieth anniversary
The 2012–13 season marked the completion of a half century of athletic competition and a quarter century sponsoring women's collegiate athletics. Before the season the league introduced a new logo to celebrate this.

The 25th season of women's athletics also marked a first for the league, as Portland State won the league's inaugural softball championship. From 1982 to 1988, women's sports were conducted in the Mountain West Athletic Conference.

The Big Sky sponsors championships in sixteen sports, including men's and women's cross country, golf, indoor and outdoor track and field, basketball, and tennis. There are also championships in football, and in women's volleyball, soccer, and softball. It is the only Division I all-sports conference that does not sponsor baseball.

Member schools

Current members

Notes

Affiliate members

Notes

Former members

Notes

Membership timeline

NCAA championships 

NCAA Division I national championships as of 2021.

† Northern Arizona is the only Big Sky program to win D1 team national titles outside of the Football Championship Subdivision (FCS).

Sports
As of the 2022–23 school year, the Big Sky sponsors championships in seven men's and nine women's NCAA sanctioned sports. Each core member institution is required to participate in all of the 13 core sports. Men's core sports are basketball, cross country, football, indoor track and field, outdoor track and field, and tennis. Women's core sports are basketball, cross country, golf, indoor track and field, outdoor track and field, tennis, and volleyball.

Cal Poly and UC Davis participate as football-only affiliates, otherwise participating in the Big West Conference. Binghamton and, through the 2022–23 season, Hartford are affiliates in men's golf only, with Binghamton otherwise participating in the America East Conference and Hartford as a D-I independent before it departs for Division III in July 2023. Before the 2014–15 school year, the latter two schools had participated in men's golf alongside five full Big Sky members in the single-sport America Sky Conference. The return of Idaho brought the number of members participating in men's golf to six, which led to the Big Sky adding men's golf and absorbing the America Sky Conference.

Baseball
The Big Sky is unusual among Division I all-sports conferences in not sponsoring baseball, a distinction that it shares only with the Mid-Eastern Athletic Conference, and which it held alone prior to the 2022–23 school year. The conference originally sponsored baseball in 1964, with all members participating. When Boise State and Northern Arizona arrived for the 1971 season, competition was split into two divisions of four teams each, with the winners in a best-of-three championship series. Montana State and Montana soon dropped the sport and by the 1973 season, only six teams remained but the divisions were kept, and Boise State moved over to the North Division for 

In May 1974, the Big Sky announced its intention to discontinue five of its ten sponsored sports. It retained football, basketball, cross-country, track, and wrestling, and dropped conference competition in baseball, golf, tennis, swimming, and skiing. Of the eleven Big Sky baseball titles, four each went to Idaho and Gonzaga, and three to Weber State. Gonzaga won the final title in 1974 over Idaho State in three games, after losing the first game in Pocatello. Southern division champion Idaho State chose to end its baseball program weeks following the conference's announcement, and Gonzaga, Idaho, and Boise State joined the new Northern Pacific Conference (NorPac) for baseball  Boise State and Idaho competed in the NorPac for six seasons, then discontinued baseball after the 

Idaho (4) 1964, 1966, 1967, 1969
Gonzaga (4) 1965, 1971, 1973, 1974
 Weber State (3) 1968, 1970, 1972

In 2016, North Dakota announced in April that it was their last baseball season. Since then, only Northern Colorado and Sacramento State have competed in the sport, both as affiliate members in the Western Athletic Conference (WAC) until Northern Colorado baseball moved to the Summit League after the 2021 season.

Wrestling
Through the 1987 season, the conference sponsored wrestling. Boise State and Idaho State dominated in most years, winning ten and eight conference titles, respectively. BSU won seven consecutive from 1974 to 1980. Montana State and Weber State also had some good years; Montana won their only conference title in the last year Big Sky sponsored the sport.

Montana State (3) 1964, 1965, 1966
Idaho State (8) 1967, 1968, 1969, 1970, 1971, 1972, 1973, 1984
Boise State (10) 1974, 1975, 1976, 1977, 1978, 1979, 1980, 1982, 1985, 1986
Weber State (2) 1981, 1983
Montana (1) 1987

Boise State continued its wrestling program as an affiliate member of the Pac-10 Conference.

Men's sponsored sports by school

Men's varsity sports not sponsored by the Big Sky Conference which are played by Big Sky schools:

Women's sponsored sports by school

Women's varsity sports not sponsored by the Big Sky Conference which are played by Big Sky schools:

Facilities

Basketball

Current NBA players
 Damian Lillard, Weber State

Conference rivalries
 Idaho and Idaho State
 Idaho and Montana
 Idaho State and Weber State
 Montana and Montana State
 Weber State and Southern Utah
 Eastern Washington and Montana
 Northern Arizona and Southern Utah

Non-conference rivalries
 Weber State and Utah State/Utah/BYU/Utah Valley
 Eastern Washington and Gonzaga
 Idaho and Washington State Cougars, Battle of the Palouse
 Idaho and Boise State
 Idaho State and Wyoming
 Montana and Wyoming
 Montana State and Wyoming
 Sacramento State and UC Davis
 Portland State and Portland
 Northern Colorado and Colorado State
 Northern Colorado and Denver

2021-22 Home Game Attendance Averages

Rivalries

Protected football rivalries
Because there are 12 teams in the conference, but each team only plays eight conference football games per year, the conference has set two "protected rivalry" games for each team. These rivalry match-ups are played every season, while football games against other conference teams are played twice every three years. Many of the protected rivalries are traditional, due to the teams either being in the same state or within close geographical proximity. As of July 2022, the following rivalries are protected through 2024.

Conference

Non-conference

Commissioners 
 Jack Friel (1963–71)
 John Roning (1971–77)
 Steve Belko (1977–81)
 Ron Stephenson (1981–95)
 Doug Fullerton (1995–2016)
 Andrea Williams (2016–2018)
 Ron Loghry (interim, 2018)
 Tom Wistrcill (2018–present)

Headquarters 
 Pullman, Washington (1963–1971)
 Boise, Idaho (1971–1995)
 Ogden, Utah (1995–2019)
 Farmington, Utah (2019–present)

Big Sky championships

Men's basketball 

 Prior to 1976, each NCAA regional had a third place game (won 1969; lost 1972, 1975)
 The only Big Sky team to reach the Elite Eight in the NCAA tournament was Idaho State in 1977
 The only Big Sky team to earn a bye in the NCAA tournament was Idaho in 1982
 Through 2023, the Big Sky has yet to have an at-large team in the NCAA tournament

Championships (by school)

NCAA tournament
Since 1968, the Big Sky champion has received a berth in the NCAA tournament; the conference tournament winner has been the representative since its introduction in 1976.

The best finish by a Big Sky team came in 1977, when the Idaho State Bengals of Jim Killingsworth advanced to the Elite Eight, with a one-point upset of UCLA in the Sweet Sixteen in Provo, Utah. Two days later, the Bengals led UNLV by a point at halftime, but lost by seventeen and finished at 

Seeding was introduced in 1979 when it expanded to forty teams, and the highest seed granted a Big Sky team was in 1982: ranked eighth in the final polls with a  record, the Idaho Vandals under Don Monson were seeded third in the West regional. After a first round bye, they beat Lute Olson's Iowa Hawkeyes in nearby Pullman in overtime, but lost to second-seeded (and fourth-ranked) Oregon State in the regional semifinals (Sweet Sixteen), also played in Provo. (Idaho had defeated OSU by 22 points in December in the Far West Classic at Portland.)

Other Big Sky teams that advanced to regional semifinals (Sweet Sixteen) include the Weber State Wildcats in 1969 and 1972, when the total field was 25 teams, and the Montana Grizzlies under Jud Heathcote in the 32-team field in 1975. The Griz fell to UCLA by just three points, who went on to win another title in John Wooden's final year as head coach. (A year later, Heathcote was hired at Michigan State with Monson as an assistant for the first two years; in his third season, the Spartans won the national title in 1979.)

Since 1982, only three teams from the Big Sky have advanced within the NCAA tournament, and none past the round of 32. Weber State won in 1995 and 1999, coached by Ron Abegglen, and Montana in 2006, led by alumnus Larry Krystkowiak. Prior to Idaho in 1982, the Big Sky had been seeded seventh (Weber State, 1979 & 1980; and Idaho, 1981); the highest seed for the conference since 1982 is ninth (Weber State, 1983), and the highest since expanding to 64 teams in 1985 is twelfth (Weber State in 2003; Montana in 2006).

Through 2022, the Big Sky has yet to receive an at-large bid to the NCAA tournament. The first NIT appearance for the conference was Idaho in 1983; two Big Sky teams advanced to the NIT's round of 16: Weber State (1984) and Boise State (1987).

Women's basketball 

 Mountain West Athletic Conference (MWAC) through 1988 season

Football titles
Bold = National Champions

Football championships (by school)

All-time school records by wins for current teams
This list goes through the 2020 season.

This list includes former member North Dakota and excludes current member Idaho. Records do not match NCAA record book.

Overall Big Sky Conference champions

See also
List of American collegiate athletic stadiums and arenas

References

External links
 

 
Sports in the Western United States
Ogden, Utah
Sports organizations established in 1963